Kaiser Convention Center is a historic, publicly owned multi-purpose building located in Oakland, California. The facility includes a 5,492-seat arena, a large theater, and a large ballroom. The building is #27 on the list of Oakland Historic Landmarks., and was listed on the National Register of Historic Places in 2021.

The building is located at 10 10th Street, in the Civic Center district of the city. It is next to the Oakland Museum, Laney College, Lake Merritt, and near the Lake Merritt BART station.

History

The Beaux-Arts style landmark was built in 1914; the architect was John J. Donovan. The structural engineer was Maurice Couchot. Originally known as the Oakland Civic Auditorium, it was renamed in honor of Henry J. Kaiser after a 1984 renovation.

The city closed the facility in 2006 and its future was uncertain for a decade. In 2006, Oakland voters defeated a ballot proposition advocating a library space in the building.

The facility was owned by the City of Oakland until 2011, when it was sold to the local redevelopment agency for $28 million. However, the redevelopment agency was dissolved by the State of California in 2012, so ownership reverted to the city of Oakland.

In 2015 the city chose a local developer, Orton Development, Inc. to renovate the facility. The plans are to turn it into a commercial space, with the Calvin Simmons Theater being renovated as a performing arts venue. The building is also supposed to be registered as a national historic landmark.

Notable events

During the 1918 flu pandemic the auditorium was used as a makeshift infirmary.

Until 1941, Kaiser Arena hosted the Ringling Brothers and Barnum and Bailey Circus. In 1942, the Circus moved across the bay to the San Francisco Civic Auditorium and then in the mid-1960s to the Cow Palace.

In the 1950s and 1960s the Roller Derby played there hundreds of times. The auditorium hosted the Oakland Symphony Orchestra until 1972, and the arena was home to the Oakland Skates roller hockey team in 1996.

For almost 70 years, from 1919 until 1987, the arena was home to the annual Christmas Pageant (later the Oakland Children's Holiday Pageant) involving at least 1,700 youngsters from 70 city schools. The organizer, professional ballerina and dance teacher Louise Jorgensen, went to each school to train the children for their role as elves, toys, poinsettias or fairies.

Elvis Presley performed at the convention center on June 3, 1956, and again on October 27, 1957.

On December 28, 1962, Martin Luther King Jr. spoke to an audience of 7,000 at the auditorium to mark the 100th anniversary of the Emancipation Proclamation.

Ike & Tina Turner performed at the Oakland Auditorium on January 13, 1967.

From 1967 through 1989, the Grateful Dead, an American rock band, performed at the convention center 57 times. Their first 23 concerts at the convention center were billed at "Oakland Auditorium", and later, starting in 1985, the venue changed to "Henry J. Kaiser Convention Center". In the 80's the band started performing "runs" of shows over the course of three to seven days.

On November 23, 1969, Western swing pioneer and TV personality Spade Cooley received a 72-hour furlough from Vacaville prison to play a benefit concert for the Deputy Sheriffs Association of Alameda County. During the intermission, after a standing ovation, he died of a heart attack. He was to be paroled on February 22, 1970.

On November 30, 1979, Bob Marley and the Wailers played at the Oakland Auditorium on the Survival Tour.

On August 6, 1988, the arena hosted a stop of NWA wrestling's Great American Bash tour. The Main Event featured a WarGames match between The Four Horsemen and the team of Dusty Rhodes, Lex Luger, and The Road Warriors and Paul Ellering.

Megadeth played an ill-fated show on October 3, 1988, in which frontman Dave Mustaine was severely intoxicated and began ranting against his former band Metallica (who were present at the show), and began verbally assaulting several audience members. He would also go on to denounce Metallica bassist Jason Newsted, and replacement guitarist Kirk Hammett.

On the evening of October 20, 1991 as the bands Anthrax, Public Enemy and Primus performed inside while across Lake Merritt the flames of the Oakland firestorm of 1991 were clearly visible from the hall's entrance as Bill Graham stood and greeted patrons at the top of the entry a mere five days before his untimely death.

From 1997 through 1999 the arena played host to the University of California, Berkeley's women's basketball team while the team's on-campus venue, Haas Pavilion, was being renovated.

In January 2012 Occupy Oakland marched on the facility, stating their intent to reclaim this abandoned space for the people, but were kept away by police. The action and subsequent incidents that day resulted in over 400 arrests by the Oakland Police Department and in an undetermined cost to the city due to damage and vandalism.

On March 9, 2022, the unidentified, mummified body of a man was found within a wall of the building during renovations. A sheriff's spokesman said the body appeared to have been there for "many years". In April 2022 the body was identified as that of a 44-year-old homeless man who had been missing since August 2020. He was identified by means of the serial number on a surgical metal plate in his ankle.

See also

 List of convention centers in the United States

References

External links

Buildings and structures in Oakland, California
Convention centers in California
Indoor arenas in California
Sports venues in Oakland, California
California Golden Bears basketball venues
Henry J. Kaiser
Oakland Skates
National Register of Historic Places in Alameda County, California